Rose Hill High School is a public high school in Rose Hill, Kansas, United States, and operated by Rose Hill USD 394 school district. The school's mascot is a rocket. The school colors are red and white. The school competes in the Ark Valley-Chisholm Trail league and is in Division IV.

Notable alumni
 Kendall Gammon - Former NFL longsnapper and Kansas City Chiefs radio show host.

See also
 List of high schools in Kansas
 List of unified school districts in Kansas

References

Public high schools in Kansas
Schools in Butler County, Kansas